Phoolchand Hembram (born 15 December 1989) is an Indian professional footballer who plays as a defender for Mohammedan in the I-League.

Career
Before playing for Mohammedan, Hambram played for Techno Aryan F.C. in the Calcutta Football League. He then joined Mohammedan for whom he made his professional debut on 20 October 2013 against Rangdajied United F.C. in the I-League in which he started and played the full match as Mohammedan won 3–0.

Career statistics

References

External links 
 I-League Profile.

1989 births
Living people

Indian footballers
Mohammedan SC (Kolkata) players
Association football defenders

I-League players
Place of birth missing (living people)
Santali people
Peerless SC players